László Halász (born 24 January 1959) is a Hungarian former cyclist. He competed in the individual road race and team time trial events at the 1980 Summer Olympics.

References

External links
 

1959 births
Living people
Hungarian male cyclists
Olympic cyclists of Hungary
Cyclists at the 1980 Summer Olympics
People from Szekszárd
Sportspeople from Tolna County